Hennadiy Zubov (born 12 September 1977), is a former footballer and Ukraine international.

Career
Zubov, a short midfielder (only 162 cm), is most-known for his playing days at Shakhtar Donetsk (1994–2004), as he was one of the few reliable midfielders that helped Shakhtar become one of the two football powerhouses in Ukraine. During his career, Zubov has amassed 29 international caps representing Ukraine, while scoring 3 goals.

Zubov played several games for Ukrainian First League side Stal Alchevsk in 2006 and for FC Komunalnyk Luhansk in the Ukrainian Second League 2007 season and was released in October 2007 and subsequently retired. His career achievements saw him inducted into the Viktor Leonenko Hall of Fame in March 2012.

Career statistics

Club

References

1977 births
Living people
People from Alchevsk
Ukrainian footballers
Ukraine international footballers
Ukraine under-21 international footballers
Ukrainian Premier League players
FC Stal Alchevsk players
FC Shakhtar Donetsk players
FC Mariupol players
FC Zorya Luhansk players
FC Komunalnyk Luhansk players
FC Metalurh Donetsk players
Association football midfielders
FC Shakhtar Donetsk non-playing staff
Sportspeople from Luhansk Oblast